Miss World Philippines 2013 was the 3rd edition of the Miss World Philippines pageant. It was held at the Solaire Resort & Casino in Parañaque, Philippines. on August 18, 2013.

At the end of the event, Queenierich Rehman crowned Megan Young as Miss World Philippines 2013. Janicel Lubina was named as First Princess, Zahra Bianca Saldua as Second Princess, Bianca Paz as Third Princess, and Omarie Linn Osuna as Fourth Princess.

Young was later crowned as Miss World 2013 in Bali, Indonesia making her the first woman from the Philippines to win the title of Miss World since its creation in 1951 and the Philippines' inception in 1966.

Results
Color keys
  The contestant Won in an International pageant.

Special Awards

Contestants 
25 contestants competed for the title.

Notes

Post-pageant Notes 

 Megan Young competed at Miss World 2013 in Bali, Indonesia and won. Young is the first woman from the Philippines to win the title of Miss World.
 Janicel Lubina competed at Binibining Pilipinas 2015 and was crowned Binibining Pilipinas International 2015. She competed at Miss International 2015 in Tokyo, Japan and finished as one of the Top 10. Lubina also bagged the Miss Best Dresser award.
 Jennifer Ruth Hammond competed at Binibining Pilipinas 2016 and was crowned Binibining Pilipinas Intercontinental 2016. She competed at Miss Intercontinental 2016 in Colombo, Sri Lanka and finished as one of the Top 15.
 Samantha Bernardo competed at Binibining Pilipinas 2018 and Binibining Pilipinas 2019 where she was named Second Runner-Up in both editions of the pageant. Bernardo was supposed to compete at Binibining Pilipinas 2021 but was appointed as Binibining Pilipinas Grand International 2020 before the pageant was held. Bernardo competed at Miss Grand International 2020 and finished as First Runner-Up.

References

External links
 Official Miss World Philippines website

2013 beauty pageants
2013 in the Philippines
2013